Heksis is an online Polish-English quarterly magazine published by MUZAIOS. It is a continuation of the magazine of the same name published by STAKROOS from 1995–2000. The 1995-2000 issues (in Polish) are available on the Heksis website. The thematic scope of the magazine is philosophy (the subject, knowledge, and cognition), the arts (music, painting, sculpture, visual arts, and dance) and science (medicine, psychology, and education).

Editors in chief 
The founding editor in chief of Heksis was Tadeusz Kobierzycki between 1995 and 2000.

See also
 List of magazines in Poland

External links
 

1995 establishments in Poland
Magazines established in 1995
Magazines published in Warsaw
Philosophy magazines
Polish-language magazines
Quarterly magazines